Night Flight is an online visual-arts magazine and variety television show that originated on cable TV network USA Network. It originally aired from 1981 to 1988 before moving to syndication in the early 1990s. The show relaunched online on nightflight.com in 2015 with original episodes that can be streamed on the subscription channel Night Flight Plus. In April 2018, it returned to cable television as a short form (15 minute) program airing late Friday nights/early Saturday mornings on the network IFC. It includes a mix of mainstream and alternative music videos, artist interviews, B movies, documentaries, short films, stand-up comedy and animation.

History
Jeff Franklin (head of American Talent International) and Stuart S. Shapiro (head of International Harmony) approached USA Network about developing Night Flight in February 1981.

A new series that defied conventional formats and easy categorization was an acceptable risk to USA, and it aired the first episode of Night Flight on June 5, 1981. The timing was a deliberate move to exploit the Hollywood writers' strike, which had halted production on NBC's highly popular program Saturday Night Live.

Episodes originally lasted four hours each, and aired in the late-night programming block after 11:00 PM Eastern Time on Friday and Saturday nights. The final original broadcast of Night Flight aired December 30, 1988; it was replaced with the programs Camp Midnite and USA Up All Night starring Gilbert Gottfried, starting the following week.

In 1990, Night Flight was revived in syndication. New episodes were produced for three seasons until 1992, when the program reverted to selected reruns of episodes from the USA Network years hosted by Tom Juarez. These “best of” shows were aired as late as 1996.

In 2015, the series found a new life on NightFlight.com. In addition to the original series, it features new short and feature films, as well as curated YouTube and Vimeo clips. A subscription service called Night Flight Plus launched in March 2016 which allows viewers to pay a monthly or annual fee for access to full segments of the show.

In 2018, a new Night Flight program began airing on IFC as a 15-minute series. It mixes highlights from the original series with surreal footage taken from films, television and the Internet.

Format
Night Flight was one of the first sources in American television to see full-length and short films not generally aired on network television, or even pay-cable TV channels such as HBO. It was the first place that many Americans were able to see music documentaries such as Another State of Mind, The Grateful Dead Movie, Word, Sound and Power and Yessongs. Night Flight was also one of the first American television shows to present the music video as a serious visual art form rather than a  mere promotional tool for musicians. Late-night broadcasts also afforded cable television the freedom to air portions of videos that MTV and other outlets had either censored or banned.

There was no on-camera host in the original series. Pat Prescott introduced segments with a voiceover just before they began. Recurring segments included:

Take Off - A segment that grouped together music videos based on a single unifying theme, and added a mix of interviews and snippets from movies to help round out the segment.  Examples from the show are Take Off To Animation, Take Off To Sex, Take Off To Violence, etc.  San Francisco-based production company VideoWest produced the segment from 1981 to 1983, with news reporter Dave McQueen doing the voice-overs. From 1983 on, Night Flight's producers (ATI Video) were in charge of producing the segment with Prescott narrating.
New Wave Theatre - Hosted by Peter Ivers, the show featured punk and New Wave acts, chiefly from the Los Angeles area.
The Video Artist - A segment covering artists working in the then-new world of video and computer graphics.
The Comic - Profiles of various comedians, consisting of stand-up bits interspersed with interview segments. This segment was also known as Night Flight's Comedy Cuts toward the end of the show's run.
Video Profile - A segment featuring videos by one particular band or artist. Works included Suspicious Circumstances, by Jim Blashfield, "Metal Dogs of India" and "Machine Song" by Chel White, and works by the Brothers Quay.
Atomic TV - A segment featuring various Cold War-era footage
Love That Bob (Church of the Sub-Genius) - A serialized presentation of the Sub-Genius video Arise!
Rick Shaw's Takeout Theater with Frankie Pace
Dynaman - An English-dubbed parody of six episodes of the Super Sentai series Kagaku Sentai Dynaman
Space Patrol - An early 1950s American sci-fi television series
Tales of Tomorrow
Heavy Metal Heroes
The Some Bizzare Show, featuring the artists of the Some Bizzare Records label
Snub TV alternative music program, first two seasons produced in the UK.
Bela Lugosi's Monogram films were recurring features.  Other segments included condensed parodies of low-quality, out-of-copyright black-and-white-era movies and serial, as well as letters from viewers.

Show development
Night Flights Director of Programming, Stuart Samuels, was a former professor of History at the University of Pennsylvania who also taught seminars at the annual Cannes Film Festival. He also authored a book on cult films, Midnight Movies.

In an interview in issue #77 of Boston Rock, Samuels said the concept of airing films centered around a single theme was intended to have the effect that "the videos were saying something to each other and were letting the audience make conclusions from them." Samuels also said the show was never trying to compete with MTV; he felt the content of Night Flight was "...a little more selective... intelligent and... stimulating."

Samuels said Night Flight was the first show to place director's names on the videos, interview the bands, create band profiles, air uncensored videos, and to air longform 12" remix videos. He said they were also the first music video show to employ political themes, such as apartheid. The intent, he said, was not to be "...heavy-handed, but do 'here's-something-that's-in-the-news' shows".

The eventual backlash against the repetition of rock videos inspired Night Flight to program even more public domain animation (especially those from the Fleischer Studios, Ub Iwerks, etc.), cult and camp films in the mid- to late 1980s into the early 1990s. The show was thus instrumental in the distribution of cult, midnight movie and campy films.

List of selected films shown on Night Flight

Andy Warhol's Dracula
Andy Warhol's Frankenstein
Another State of Mind
Anti-Clock
Assassin of Youth
Bambi Meets Godzilla
The Brain
Breaking Glass
Daughters of Darkness
Dementia 13
Eating Raoul 
Eraserhead (clips only)
Fantastic Animation Festival (one of the earliest NF episodes) 
Fantastic Planet
Fritz the Cat
I Was a Zombie for the F.B.I.
J-Men Forever (Firesign Theatre)
Kentucky Fried Movie
Ladies and Gentlemen, The Fabulous Stains
Liquid Sky 
Magical Mystery Tour
Mickey One
The Pace That Kills
Pink Flamingos 
Quasi at the Quackadero
The Red House
Reefer Madness
Rock & Rule (clips only)
The Rocky Horror Picture Show (clips only)
Rude Boy
Scared to Death
Smithereens
Spooks Run Wild
Suburbia 
Taking Off
The Terror
The Terror of Tiny Town
Urgh! A Music War (clips only)

Reception
TV Guide called Night Flight the "Best Pop Music Magazine show on cable". USA Today would later echo that sentiment, declaring it "the most creative use of music and video on television today".

References

Notes
 Denisoff, R. Serge (1998). Inside MTV. Transaction Publishers. .

External links
 
 

1981 American television series debuts
1988 American television series endings
1990 American television series debuts
1996 American television series endings
1980s American music television series
1990s American music television series
1980s American variety television series
1990s American variety television series
USA Network original programming
1980s American anthology television series
1990s American anthology television series
American television series revived after cancellation
Internet television channels
IFC (American TV channel) original programming
First-run syndicated television programs in the United States